Auteco was a Nahua language spoken in the Milpa valley area of Jalisco prior to the coming of the Spanish.  It is now extinct.

Sources
Gerhard, Peter. Guide to the Historical Geography of New Spain. Cambridge: University Press, 1972. p. 58.

Extinct languages of North America
Nahuatl